Hygropora is a genus of beetles belonging to the family Staphylinidae.

The species of this genus are found in Europe.

Species:
 Hygropora cunctans (Erichson, 1837) 
 Hygropora longicornis Palm, 1949

References

Staphylinidae
Staphylinidae genera